Complete list of all foreign-born players who, despite having been born abroad, have represented Spain men's national basketball team in international competition since 1935. Some of them were born to Spanish parents abroad, some moved to Spain at a young age, and some others were "naturalized" or acquired citizenship after playing professionally in a Spanish club.

Up to 4 players born in Latin America were in the Spanish squad for the first EuroBasket in 1935, where Spain won the silver medal: brothers Emilio and Pedro Alonso, Rafael Martín and Rafael Ruano. Two Americans were a key factor in the modernization of the sport in Spain in the late 60s and the 70s, Wayne Brabender and Clifford Luyk, with the silver medal at the 1973 EuroBasket as their highest success. Two more Latin Americans were included in the 1980s, Argentinian Juan Domingo de la Cruz and Dominican Chicho Sibilio.

Modern FIBA regulations about the Eligibility and National Status of Players limit the number of naturalized players to one per squad:"A national team participating in a Competition of FIBA may have only one player on its team who has acquired the legal nationality of that country by naturalisation or by any other means after having reached the age of sixteen" (Book 3, Chapter 1, Article 21.a)In recent years, this regulation on a team's roster has avoided the inclusion of Serge Ibaka and Nikola Mirotić at the same time

List of players 
Note: list updated to senior team call-up in September 2019. Players in bold are still active at international level.

Notes 
  Soviet Union dissolved in December 1991 into 15 independent countries, Russia being one of them.
  SFR Yugoslavia dissolved in 1992 into 5 independent countries, Bosnia and Herzegovina, Croatia, Macedonia, Slovenia, and the Federal Republic of Yugoslavia. FR Yugoslavia was renamed into Serbia and Montenegro in February 2003 and dissolved in June 2006 into two independent countries, Montenegro and Serbia.

Other players 
 Chilean-Spanish Álvaro Salvadores, born in Spain in 1928, whose family emigrated to Chile due to the Spanish Civil War (1936-1939). He took part in the first FIBA Basketball World Cup, hosted by Argentina in 1950, having offered himself to the Spanish Federation. He also competed in the 1952 Summer Olympics with Chile.
 Finnish-born Carlos Ruf, born in Hamina to a Finnish mother, raised in Barcelona. won the silver medal in the 1985 U-16 European Championship with Spain. He played for the Cadet, Junior and U-22 squads.
 American Brad Oleson acquired Spanish nationality in 2009, and was selected to the senior men's Spain national team training camp pre-squad for the 2010 FIBA World Championship.

See also 

 Spanish Basketball Federation
 Spain men's national basketball team
 Spain national youth basketball teams
 Medal winners in Spain national basketball team

External links 

 Official website
 Spanish Basketball Federation website

References